Admiral Sir Arthur John Davies, KBE, CB (26 September 1877 – 13 December 1954) was a Royal Navy officer who served in both world wars.

Despite his age, Davies volunteered for service during the Second World War and served as a convoy commodore in the Royal Naval Reserve from 1940 to 1944, for which he was mentioned in despatches and knighted KBE in 1943.

References 

1877 births
1954 deaths
Royal Navy admirals
Knights Commander of the Order of the British Empire
Companions of the Order of the Bath
Royal Naval Reserve personnel